The following units and commanders of the Confederate Army fought at the Siege of Corinth (29 Apr-30 May 1862) of the American Civil War. The Union order of battle is shown separately. Order of battle compiled from the Official Records of the American Civil War as they appeared on June 30, 1862.

Abbreviations used

Military Rank
 Gen = General
 LTG = Lieutenant General
 MG = Major General
 BG = Brigadier General
 Col = Colonel
 Ltc = Lieutenant Colonel
 Maj = Major
 Cpt = Captain
 Lt = Lieutenant

Other
 w = wounded
 mw = mortally wounded
 k = killed

Department Number Two
Gen Pierre G. T. Beauregard

Army of Tennessee

Gen Braxton Bragg

I Corps

MG Leonidas Polk

II Corps

MG Thomas C. Hindman until 2 June
MG Samuel Jones

III Corps

MG William J. Hardee

Reserve Corps
MG John C. Breckinridge

Army of the West

MG Earl Van Dorn

References

Sources
U.S. War Department, The War of the Rebellion: a Compilation of the Official Records of the Union and Confederate Armies, U.S. Government Printing Office, 1880–1901.
 Eicher, John H., and David J. Eicher. Civil War High Commands. Stanford, California: Stanford University Press, 2001. .

American Civil War orders of battle